Kim Petras (born 27 August 1992) is a German singer and songwriter based in Los Angeles, California. Between 2016 and 2020, she released music as an independent artist under her own imprint, BunHead Records, before signing with Amigo and Republic Records in 2021.

Petras began recording music as a teenager. She independently released her debut international single, "I Don't Want It at All", in 2017. Several of her singles that followed—"Feeling of Falling", "Heart to Break", and "1, 2, 3 Dayz Up"—charted on Billboards Dance/Electronic Songs chart. In 2019, Petras independently released her debut album, Clarity, and her second studio album, Turn Off the Light. 

Petras signed with Republic Records in 2021 and released the EP Slut Pop, her first project with Republic, the following year. Petras's collaborative 2022 single "Unholy" with Sam Smith topped charts internationally, including the UK Singles Chart and the Billboard Hot 100, making her the first openly transgender solo artist to reach number one in the United States. Petras was the first openly transgender artist to receive a Grammy Award for Best Pop Duo/Group Performance for "Unholy" in 2023 and the second transgender woman to win a Grammy following Wendy Carlos.

Early life 
Petras was born in Cologne, Germany. Her mother is a choreographer and artist, her father is an architect, and her older sister is also a singer. In 2006, Petras, then aged 13, appeared on a German television current affairs show in which she discussed her medical gender transition. At age 14, Petras appeared in a documentary and a talk show, in a push to get permission for early gender confirmation surgery at age 16, before the minimum age of 18 in Germany. These appearances resulted in international media coverage of her transition, touting her as the "world's youngest transsexual".

In September 2007, she was a model for a German chain of hair salons. Petras was evaluated by the head of the psychiatric unit at Frankfurt Hospital, Dr Bernd Meyenburg, and approved for gender confirmation surgery at 16 years old; Petras announced, in November 2008, that the surgery was completed. The Daily Telegraph claimed Petras was the youngest person in the world to have had that surgery at the time. About her surgery, she stated, "I was asked if I feel like a woman now – but the truth is I have always felt like a woman – I just ended up in the wrong body".

In an interview with BuzzFeed, Petras said the first song she ever wrote was "about this dude in second grade who didn't like me back".

Career

2008–2015: Career beginnings 

Between 2008 and 2009, Petras released a string of singles under Joyce Records: "Fade Away" (2008), "Last Forever," "Die for You," and "Boomerang" (all 2009). In 2009, she was featured on "Taste" by Sobertruth and in 2011 was featured on "Magnetic". Later in 2011, Petras released her debut extended play, One Piece of Tape, under the imprint Bionic Ballroom.

In 2013, Petras was featured on two singles named "Flight to Paris" and "Hearbeat" by German DJ Klaas. Throughout the next few years, Petras worked with producers including The Stereotypes, C.J. Abraham, Stephen Dresser, Johan "Jones" Wetterberg, Edward Ellis, and Aaron Joseph on a music career, releasing demos on her SoundCloud page, including one titled "STFU". For her contributions to social media, Petras was ranked at number 19 on Billboard Artist Chart, listing developing artists, in July 2013. In 2015, Petras appeared on "You" by Isaac Phase for his album, Phase 00001.

2017–2019: Breakthrough with Era 1 

In August 2017, Petras released her debut single "I Don't Want It at All", The song went on to reach the Spotify Global Viral chart. The accompanying music video for the song premiered in October on Vevo, and features a cameo appearance by Paris Hilton. In the same month, she was picked by Spotify to be one of the four artists named as a RISE Artist, a "program designed to identify and break the next wave of music superstars." During the end of 2017, Petras was dubbed "most likely to dominate the pop charts" by Paper magazine, and appeared on Charli XCX's mixtape Pop 2 (2017) for the track "Unlock It" alongside Jay Park.

In January 2018, the Nicholas Harwood-directed video for Petras' single "Faded", which features Lil Aaron, premiered on Noisey, That same month, she appeared in the January issue of Galore. Petras released the breakup-inspired "Heart to Break" in February, to commemorate Valentine's Day. The song was given its radio debut on BBC Radio 1 on 19 February. Bryan Kress of Billboard noted how while the single is "still keeping Petras' upbeat, unabashed pop sound... [it] ventures into new territory for the songwriter."

On 1 October 2018, Petras released Turn Off the Light, Vol. 1, a Halloween-themed extended play. The project was seen as a departure from Petras' typical sound, and features a guest appearance from the horror hostess character Elvira. Afterwards, Petras announced plans to release a single a month as a lead up to her debut album. She was featured on Cheat Codes' song "Feeling of Falling" in November 2018. Petras has been credited with composing the song "Young & Wild" on Twice's 6th EP, Yes or Yes.

In February 2019, Petras released three singles titled "1, 2, 3 Dayz Up" featuring Sophie, "If U Think About Me...", and "Homework" featuring Lil Aaron. Petras has not publicly expressed plans to release an album with any of her digital singles from 2016 until early 2019, but has referred to this release period as Era 1. 
In March 2019, Petras appeared as a headline act at the Sydney Gay and Lesbian Mardi Gras, noted as one of the world's largest pride festivals, which has been headlined by other notable acts including Kylie Minogue, Cher, Dua Lipa, Kesha, Sam Smith, The Veronicas and George Michael.

2019–2020: Clarity and Turn Off the Light 

Petras released her debut album, Clarity, on 28 June 2019. Throughout May and June, Petras released one song a week as a lead-up to the album's release. In June, Petras embarked on the 24 date "Broken Tour" across North America and Europe. Petras was featured on the covers of Galore and Notion magazines that same month. The album was preceded by promotional singles including "All I Do Is Cry" and "Sweet Spot" and was accompanied by the lead single, "Icy", on its release date.

In August, Petras announced that there would be a limited edition vinyl pressing of Turn Off the Light, Vol. 1 through Urban Outfitters. Petras has announced that Turn Off the Light, Vol. 2 will be released exactly a year after the first part. On 1 October 2019, Petras' second studio album Turn Off the Light was released. The album features all of the songs from Vol. 1 as well as nine new tracks, with a bonus track added a year later. On 11 February 2020, she released the single "Reminds Me". That same month, she announced that she would be the supporting act on the European leg of Camila Cabello's The Romance Tour, which was postponed due to the coronavirus pandemic.

On 7 May, Petras released the single "Malibu" as the lead single off of her next album. The song was promoted by a performance on Jimmy Kimmel Live! and charted in the United Kingdom. Petras was later featured on the song "Broken Glass" by Kygo, from his album Golden Hour, released 29 May. On 23 October, Petras announced that Turn Off the Light, Vol. 3 will be released some time in 2021 "when [she] can perform it live". She also released a new song "Party Till I Die". Petras' song "Reminds Me" was sampled by the Kid Laroi for his song "Reminds Me of You", a collaboration with Juice Wrld released on the first anniversary of his death.

2020–present: Scrapped third studio album and "Unholy" 
On 6 November 2020, Petras was featured on K/DA's EP All Out, appearing on the song "Villain" alongside Madison Beer, which charted in New Zealand and on the US World Songs chart. In 2021, Petras was featured on remixes of several songs made popular on TikTok, including "Jenny" with Studio Killers, and "SugarCrash!" by ElyOtto and Curtis Waters. Additionally, her 2017 song "Unlock It" with Charli XCX and Jay Park went viral on the app. Petras additionally announced Turn Off the Light, Vol. 3 would be released sometime in 2021, although this plan did not come to fruition.

In August 2021, Petras signed to Republic Records and released "Future Starts Now" as the lead single from her upcoming major-label debut studio album. Petras performed the song at the 2021 MTV Video Music Awards pre-show on 12 September 2021, as the first out trans artist to perform at the VMAs. In November 2021, she performed two more singles from the forthcoming album — "Coconuts" and "Hit It from the Back" — when she appeared at the 2021 MTV Europe Music Awards, becoming the first out trans artist to perform at the EMAs, a show that MTV had deliberately hosted in Budapest, as "an opportunity to stand in solidarity" in protest against the Hungarian anti-LGBT law; likewise Petras's performance was intentionally raunchy and "sex positive" and spoke out to say "It's going to be pretty powerful to be in Hungary and perform the show when these laws have just happened". Petras also performed at the 2021 Macy's Thanksgiving Day Parade, becoming the first out trans performer to do so. She was featured in the 2021 holiday film The Bitch Who Stole Christmas. On 3 December 2021, after overwhelming fan response on TikTok, Petras released "Coconuts", doing so around a month earlier than scheduled.

On 10 February 2022, after teasing some of the songs on TikTok, Petras announced a surprise EP titled Slut Pop, which was released the following day.

On June 11, 2022, Petras performed at Los Angeles Pride with Christina Aguilera.

On 30 July 2022, Petras seemingly confirmed via Twitter that the album titled Problématique had been scrapped. On 2 August 2022, many songs believed to be on the album leaked online. Petras responded to these leaks on Twitter, saying "It's ok if u wanna listen to the leaks ... I'm not getting to put out any music anyways I'm fucked."

On 22 September 2022, Petras released the song "Unholy", a collaboration with Sam Smith. The track went viral on TikTok and hit number one in various countries upon release, including Australia, the United Kingdom, and New Zealand. It was also her first career entry on the U.S. Billboard Hot 100, eventually topping the chart in October 2022. This made Petras the first openly transgender woman in history to have a number-one song on the chart, and Smith the first openly non-binary person to do so.

On 5 February 2023, Petras and Smith won the Grammy Award for Best Pop Duo/Group Performance for "Unholy". This made Petras the first openly transgender artist to win a Grammy, and Smith the first non-binary artist to do so. During her acceptance speech, Petras thanked her mother, who she said "believed me, that I was a girl, and I wouldn't be here without her and her support". She also thanked musicians Madonna and Sophie.

Artistry and public image 
Petras is a pop singer who also makes electronic dance music (EDM), dance-pop, electropop and bubblegum pop. She credits the late 1990s and early 2000s pop scene, as well as 1980s Italo disco, as the primary basis for her sound. Petras describes herself as a 'Kylie Minogue stan first', citing Minogue as a key influence to her sound as a pop artist. Petras' other inspirations include Katy Perry, Cher, Lady Gaga, Rihanna, Beyoncé, Britney Spears, Christina Aguilera, Madonna and the Spice Girls, as well as Boy George, Debbie Harry, Queen, Freddie Mercury, Judy Garland, Baby E, Lil Aaron, Liz Y2K, and Kesha. In an interview, Petras stated that "To me, pop music is an escape from my problems. I can put on my headphones and listen to it for three and a half minutes to forget about everything that's bothering me. It's always been that way for me. I feel like pop definitely saved my life in so many ways."

On her song writing, Petras told Noisey that "there's something about making a song that everybody can sing and remember, and when you listen to it the first time you already know the words by the second chorus, like you've always known the song. I'm obsessed with that idea." She commented on themes, stating "I write about boys, heartbreak, sex, having fun and the things that I go through."

Following her debut, Petras was dubbed as "the new princess of pop" by Nasty Galaxy. The title was repeated by publications including Billboard, ABC News, V, and Idolator.

Following the release of her debut album Clarity (2019), many reviewers praised the record but criticized her involvement with Dr. Luke, who had been accused of sexually and verbally assaulting American singer-songwriter Kesha in 2015. The same controversy was reignited in 2022 with the release of her EP Slut Pop, also produced by Dr. Luke. After the release of the EP, "#FreeKesha" trended on Twitter and Petras faced further backlash over lyrics in the EP referencing Lady Gaga, a supporter of Kesha and a survivor of sexual assault herself.

 Awards and nominations 
{| class="wikitable sortable plainrowheaders" 
|-
! scope="col" | Award
! scope="col" | Year
! scope="col" | Nominee(s)
! scope="col" | Category
! scope="col" | Result
! scope="col" class="unsortable"| 
|-
!scope="row"|Brit Awards
|2023
|"Unholy" (with Sam Smith)
|Song of the Year
|
|
|-
!scope="row" rowspan=2|British LGBT Awards
| 2020
| rowspan=2|Herself
| rowspan=2|Top 10 Music Artists
| 
| 
|-
| 2021
| 
| 
|-
!scope="row" rowspan=2|GLAAD Media Awards
| 2019
| Turn Off the Light, Vol. 1| rowspan=2|Outstanding Music Artist
| 
| 
|-
| 2020
| Clarity| 
| 
|-
!scope="row"|Grammy Awards
| 2023
| rowspan="4"|"Unholy" (with Sam Smith)
|Best Pop Duo/Group Performance
| 
| 
|-
! scope="row" rowspan="2"|iHeartRadio Music Awards
| rowspan="2"| 2023
| Best Collaboration
| 
|rowspan="2"|
|-
| TikTok Bop of the Year
| 
|-
!scope="row" |MTV Europe Music Awards
| 2022
| Video for Good
| 
| 
|-
! scope="row" rowspan=5|Queerty Awards
| rowspan=2|2020
| Herself
| Badass
| 
| rowspan="2"|
|-
| "Sweet Spot"
| rowspan=4|Anthem
| 
|-
| 2021
| "Malibu"
| 
| 
|-
| 2022
| "Coconuts"
| 
| 
|-
| 2023
|"Unholy" (with Sam Smith)
| 
| 

 Discography 

 Studio albums
 Clarity (2019)Turn Off the Light'' (2019)

Tours 
Headlining
 The Broken Tour (2019)
 The Clarity Tour (2019–2020)

Supporting
 The Bloom Tour  (2018)
 The Romance Tour  (2020; cancelled)

Special guest
 Oil of Every Pearl's Un-Insides Promotional Tour   (2019)
 Pop 2 Tour  (2018)
 Phoenix World Tour  (2019)
 Charli Live Tour  (2019)

References

External links 

1992 births
Living people
20th-century German LGBT people
21st-century German women singers
21st-century German LGBT people
English-language singers from Germany
German expatriates in the United States
German women pop singers
German transgender people
German LGBT singers
Grammy Award winners
MTV Europe Music Award winners
Musicians from Cologne
Transgender women musicians
Women in electronic music
German dance musicians
German electronic dance music musicians
Dance-pop musicians
Transgender singers